Slavsky District is an administrative district (raion), one of the fifteen in Kaliningrad Oblast, Russia. As a municipal division, it is incorporated as Slavsky Municipal District. It is located in the northern and central parts of the oblast. Its administrative center is the town of Slavsk. Population:  21,918 (2002 Census);  The population of Slavsk accounts for 22.0% of the district's total population.

References

Notes

Sources

Districts of Kaliningrad Oblast